Warneford Place, also known as Sevenhampton Place, is a Grade II listed country house in Sevenhampton, south of Highworth, in Wiltshire, England.

The main house is modern but is listed because it incorporates some features from the original 18th century mansion. Warneford Place dates back to at least the 17th century, and was home to the Warneford family. That family, although often impoverished, had been established in the area since around the 12th century and owned much of its land. The house was often empty and neglected.

In 1902, there was an auction of the Warneford Place Estate and its contents. It has been grade II listed (as Warnford Place) since 1979.

It was home to Frederick Banbury, 1st Baron Banbury of Southam, who died there in 1936.

In 1960, the James Bond author Ian Fleming bought the "demolished Warneford Place", and built a new house which he named Sevenhampton Place, incorporating some elements of the original building. He did not move in until the new house was completed in 1963 and spent little time there. He died in 1964, aged 56, and is buried in the Sevenhampton churchyard, along with his wife Ann and son Caspar. His widow Ann Fleming lived at Sevenhampton Place until she died there  on 12 July 1981.

In 1987, the house was bought by the businessman Paddy McNally for £7 million. In 2004, the house was robbed by The Johnson Gang, who stole items to the value of £750,000.

References

Grade II listed buildings in Wiltshire
Grade II listed houses
Country houses in Wiltshire